Argonauta itoigawai is an extinct species of octopus. It was described in 1983 based on fossil material from the Pliocene Senhata Formation in Bōsō Peninsula, Japan.

References

itoigawai
Fossil taxa described in 1983
Extinct animals of Japan